The 19223/19224 Ahmedabad–Jammu Tawi Express is an Express train belonging to Indian Railways that runs between  and  in India.

It operates as train number 19223 from Ahmedabad Junction to Jammu Tawi and as train number 19224 in the reverse direction.

Coaches

19223/19224 Ahmedabad–Jammu Tawi Express presently has 1 AC 2 tier, 4 AC 3 tier, 10 Sleeper class & 6 General Unreserved coaches.

As with most train services in India, coach composition may be amended at the discretion of Indian Railways depending on demand.

Service

19223  Ahmedabad–Jammu Tawi Express covers the distance of 1476 kilometres in 32 hours 15 mins (45.77 km/hr) & in 31 hours 20 mins (47.11 km/hr) as 19223/19224 Jammu Tawi–Ahmedabad Express.

It reverses direction twice during its journey at  & .

Traction

It is hauled by a WDM-3A locomotive of Ludhiana shed from JAT till FZR. From FZR till ADI it is hauled by a Abu Road shed-based WDM-3A locomotive and vice versa.

Routeing

Time Table

 19223 Ahmedabad–Jammu Tawi Express leaves Ahmedabad Junction daily and reaches Jammu Tawi the next day.
 19224 Jammu Tawi–Ahmedabad Express leaves Jammu Tawi daily and reaches Ahmedabad Junction the next day.

External links
 
 
 
 19223 Ahmedabad Jammu Tawi Express India Rail Info
  19224 Jammu Tawi Ahmedabad Express India Rail Info

References 

Transport in Ahmedabad
Transport in Jammu
Rail transport in Gujarat
Rail transport in Rajasthan
Rail transport in Delhi
Rail transport in Haryana
Rail transport in Punjab, India
Rail transport in Jammu and Kashmir
Express trains in India